Jacob Fork is a  long, fourth-order tributary of the South Fork Catawba River in Burke and Catawba Counties, North Carolina.  According to the Geographic Names Information System, it has also been known historically as  Jacobs Creek.

Jacob Fork rises near the top of Grassy Ridge in Burke County, North Carolina, on the He Creek divide, then flows east into Catawba County to form South Fork Catawba River with Henry Fork about 3 miles southwest of Startown. It drains  of area, receives about 51.2 in/year of precipitation, has a topographic wetness index of 325.14, and is about 64% forested.

See also
List of North Carolina rivers

References

Tributaries of the Catawba River
Rivers of North Carolina
Rivers of Burke County, North Carolina
Rivers of Catawba County, North Carolina